Federica Carta may refer to:
 Federica Carta (field hockey)
 Federica Carta (singer)